Salem District (Sundanese: ᮊᮎᮙᮒᮔ᮪ ᮞᮜᮨᮙ᮪ Kacamatan Salem) is the name of an administrative district (Indonesian: Kecamatan) in Brebes Regency, Central Java, Indonesia. It covers 167.21 km2 and had a population of 56,871 at the 2010 Census and 63,462 at the 2020 Census.

References

Brebes Regency
Districts of Central Java